Following is a table of United States presidential elections in West Virginia, ordered by year. Since its admission to statehood in 1863, West Virginia has participated in every U.S. presidential election. Prior to 1863, the territory currently comprising the state of West Virginia was part of the state of Virginia, and citizens residing in that area have thus been able to participate in every U.S. election.

Winners of the state are in bold. The shading refers to the state winner, and not the national winner.

See also
 Elections in West Virginia

Notes

References